The Eastern District Council is the district council for the Eastern District in Hong Kong. It is one of 18 such councils. The Eastern District Council currently consists of 35 members, of which the district is divided into 35 constituencies, electing a total of 35 members. The last election was held on 24 November 2019.

History
The Eastern District Council was established on 28 October 1981 under the name of the Eastern District Board as the result of the colonial Governor Murray MacLehose's District Administration Scheme reform. The District Board was partly elected with the ex-officio Urban Council members, as well as members appointed by the Governor until 1994 when last Governor Chris Patten refrained from appointing any member.

The Eastern District Board became Eastern Provisional District Board after the Hong Kong Special Administrative Region (HKSAR) was established in 1997 with the appointment system being reintroduced by Chief Executive Tung Chee-hwa. The Eastern District Council was established on 1 January 2000 after the first District Council election in 1999. The council has become fully elected when the appointed seats were abolished in 2011 after the modified constitutional reform proposal was passed by the Legislative Council in 2010.

The Eastern District Council was one of the largest District Councils in Hong Kong and the largest on Hong Kong Island, now  the largest District Council replace status in the Kwun Tong District Council  . Compared to the continuing shrinking in size of the Wan Chai District Council, the government in 2015 decided to transfer Tin Hau and Victoria Park constituencies from the Eastern to the Wan Chai District Council.

Many older political organisations, especially the Reform Club of Hong Kong had a long presence in the Eastern District. In the 1985 election, an electoral coalition of 12 incumbents based on personal network surrounding Kwan Lim-ho of the Reform Club, contested in the election, winning 10 seats in total. The traditional leftists through the Hong Kong Federation of Trade Unions (FTU) also had considerable influence in their traditional stronghold of North Point and passed on its influence to the Democratic Alliance for the Betterment of Hong Kong (DAB) formed in 1992 and gradually expanded to the public estate areas in Shau Kei Wan and Chai Wan, while the influence of the pro-democrats, represented by the Democratic Party and the Civic Party today, was mostly limited to certain areas of private apartments such as Tai Koo Shing and Sai Wan Ho.

The pro-democrats achieved the majority of the council for the first time in the 2019 election in a historic landslide victory amid the pro-democracy protests, taking 32 of the 35 seats in the council, with many of the pro-Beijing strongholds in North Point fell into the hand of pro-democracy independents. The Civic Party emerged as the largest party with five seats which saw its veteran councillor Joseph Lai took the chairmanship.

Political control
Since 1982 political control of the council has been held by the following parties:

Political makeup

Elections are held every four years.

District result maps

Members represented
Starting from 1 January 2020:

Leadership

Chairs
Since 1985, the chairman is elected by all the members of the board:

Vice Chairs

Notes

References

 
Districts of Hong Kong
Eastern District, Hong Kong
District Councils of Hong Kong